Frédéric Andréi (born 23 October 1959) is a French actor and director.

In 1980 he starred in Le Voyage en douce under director Michel Deville. The next year he played the lead in Jean-Jacques Beineix's Diva, as Jules, a moped-riding postman obsessed with an American opera singer.

He directed the feature films Paris Minuit (1986) and Par suite d'un arrêt de travail (2008).

References

External links 
 

French male film actors
1959 births
Living people